Susan Lyn "Suzi" Wizowaty (born January 6, 1954) is an author and politician from Burlington, Vermont. A Democrat, she was a member of the Vermont House of Representatives, representing the Chittenden-6-5 district in Burlington from 2009 to 2015. First elected in 2008, she did not run for re-election in 2014.

Biography
Born in Cincinnati, Ohio, Wizowaty grew up in Europe, Texas and Connecticut, and graduated with an A.B. in anthropology from Princeton University in 1977 after completing a 91-page long senior thesis titled "Apple Days Delilah: A Justification for Fiction in Anthropology." She then received a M.A. from Goddard College in Plainfield, Vermont .. She lived in San Francisco, Chicago, and New Jersey before moving to Burlington in 1985.

Wizowaty has worked as a bookseller, librarian, newspaper reporter and editor, also having experience in the non-profit sector with the Vermont Humanities Council and Vermont Works for Women. A published author, she has written three novels: The Round Barn (Hardscrabble, 2002)  A Tour of Evil (Philomel, 2005), and The Return of Jason Green (Fomite, 2014).

In 2008, Wizowaty ran for the Vermont House of Representatives in the two-member Chittenden-3-5 district. She faced two incumbents in the Democratic primary but was the top vote-getter, beating Rep. Johannah Leddy Donovan, who finished in second place and Rep. Bill Keogh, who came third. In the general election held on November 4, the Democratic nominees – Wizowaty and Donovan – ran unopposed. She was re-elected to the House on November 2, 2010. Following redistricting, she was elected to represent the Chittenden 6-5 district in 2012. She did not seek re-election in 2014 and was succeeded by Mary Sullivan.

In 2013, Wizowaty founded the non-profit Vermonters for Criminal Justice Reform, which she ran for four years before stepping down in July, 2017.

References

External links
Personal website

Living people
1954 births
Politicians from Burlington, Vermont
Writers from Burlington, Vermont
Princeton University alumni
Goddard College alumni
Members of the Vermont House of Representatives
Women state legislators in Vermont
American women novelists
21st-century American novelists
21st-century American women writers
Novelists from Vermont